The Akademik Sergey Korolyov was a space control-monitoring ship or Vigilship (Veladora)  constructed in 1970 to support the Soviet space program. Named after Sergey Korolyov, the head Soviet rocket engineer and designer during the Space Race between the United States and the Soviet Union in the 1950s and 1960s, the ship also conducted upper atmosphere and outer space research.

In Soviet times, the Akademik Sergey Korolyov was a large communications ship which was part of a fleet of communications ships. These ships greatly extended the tracking range when the orbits of cosmonauts and unmanned missions were not within range of Soviet land-based tracking stations. The ship mainly operated in the Atlantic Ocean monitoring spacecraft trajectory, telemetry data, and guaranteed a communications link with the cosmonauts.

The ship had about 1200 accommodations, including 79 laboratories, in which 188 scientific workers performed their duties.

In 1975, the ship was a part of the Soviet-American Apollo–Soyuz joint test program.

Sold for scrapping and renamed OROL, arriving at Alang on 18 August 1996

See also 
 , another Soviet satellite tracking ship
 , another Soviet satellite tracking ship
 List of ships of Russia by project number

References

External links 
 A. Karpenko, ABM and Space Defense, Nevsky Bastion, No. 4, 1999, pp. 2–47, Federation of American Scientists (Online)

Auxiliary ships of the Soviet Navy
Maritime vessels related to spaceflight
Ships of the Soviet space program
Ships built at the Black Sea Shipyard
Sergei Korolev
1970 ships
Ships built in the Soviet Union